Mount Ashwood is a mountain on Vancouver Island, British Columbia, Canada, located  north of Woss.

See also
List of mountains of Canada

References

Ashwood, Mount
One-thousanders of British Columbia
Rupert Land District